William Herbert Droegemueller (October 7, 1906 – February 23, 1987) was an American athlete, born in Chicago, who competed mainly in the pole vault.

He competed for America in the 1928 Summer Olympics held in Amsterdam, Netherlands in the pole vault where he won the silver medal.

External links
 

1906 births
1987 deaths
Track and field athletes from Chicago
American male pole vaulters
Olympic silver medalists for the United States in track and field
Athletes (track and field) at the 1928 Summer Olympics
Northwestern Wildcats men's track and field athletes
Medalists at the 1928 Summer Olympics